Eroeadae or Eroiadai may refer to either of two demoi of ancient Attica:
 Eroeadae (Antiochis), of the phyle of Antiochis
 Eroeadae (Hippothontis), of the phyle of Hippothontis